Hochschule für Technik und Wirtschaft (University of Applied Sciences for Engineering and Economics) or HTW Berlin in Berlin, Germany is the largest public University of Applied Sciences in Berlin and Eastern Germany. It has over 13,000 students and 75 programs in areas of engineering, computer science, business, culture and design. At 26.4%, HTW Berlin has one of the highest proportions of international students in Germany.

In some research-intensive and innovative departments, the HTW Berlin exercises the rights to award doctorates.

History 

HTW Berlin is the result of the merger of various institutions.

1874 – founding of the Fachschule für Dekomponieren, Komponieren und Musterzeichnen (School of Engineering and Technical Drawing), which later became the Berlin School of Textiles and Fashion. It then became the Engineering School of Clothing Technology, and was incorporated into the Engineering College of Berlin (Ingenieurhochschule Berlin) in 1990.

1948 – the Engineering School for Mechanical Engineering, Electrical Engineering, and Civil Engineering was founded. This was renamed the Engineering College of Berlin in 1988.

1991 – Technische Fachhochschule Berlin (TFH, now Berliner Hochschule für Technik) was charged with founding the FHTW, unifying the Engineering College and other colleges as well as the HfÖ College of Economics, located at five different places around the former East Berlin. The TFH was given responsibility for setting up the administration and hiring new teachers, although much of the staff remained with their respective schools.

1994 – FHTW was formally declared independent.

1996 – integration of the University of Applied Sciences German Telecom into the school.

2009 – name changed from FHTW to HTW Berlin and official opening of the completed Wilhelminenhof Campus.

2019 – HTW celebrated its 25th anniversary.

Locations 

HTW Berlin currently has two campuses located in the eastern part of Berlin:
 Campus Treskowallee, Treskowallee 8, 10318 Berlin-Karlshorst
 Campus Wilhelminenhof, Wilhelminenhofstraße 75A, 12459 Berlin-Oberschöneweide

References

External links

Official website in English
Student Union website

 
Universities and colleges in Berlin
Universities of Applied Sciences in Germany
1994 establishments in Germany
Buildings and structures in Lichtenberg
Engineering universities and colleges in Germany
Educational institutions established in 1994